Erinne Willock (born October 16, 1981 in Saanich, British Columbia) is a Canadian professional road cyclist. She represented Canada at the 2008 Summer Olympics, and also claimed a silver medal in the women's time trial at the 2006 Pan American Road and Track Championships in Valencia, Venezuela. Willock currently races for TIBCO-To-The-Top pro cycling team since she joined in 2011.

Professional career
Born and raised in Victoria, British Columbia, Willock introduced to the sport at age fourteen under the guidance and mentoring of her father Martin Willock, who previously raced for Canada in the men's team time trial at the 1984 Summer Olympics in Los Angeles. Her uncle Bernie Willock, the 1980 Canadian road champion, was set to represent the same nation at the Olympic Games in Moscow before his team joined the US-led boycott.

Willock started out in track cycling and mountain biking, until she shifted to road racing in her elite level. She first joined Team Rona Esker in 2003, and has landed top three places at the Canadian Championships and at the International Tour de Toona in eastern United States. Willock's career flourished when she rode for the United States' Webcor Builders Cycling Team from 2005 to 2010. Followed by two successful pro seasons, Willock delivered her best results in the entire sporting career with a silver medal in the women's road race at the 2006 Pan American Road and Track Championships in Valencia, Venezuela, and a top twenty finish at the 2007 UCI World Championships in Stuttgart, Germany.

Continuing her family's Olympic tradition, Willock qualified for the Canadian squad in the women's road race at the 2008 Summer Olympics in Beijing by receiving the nation's third and final berth from the UCI World Cup. She successfully completed a grueling race with a thirty-seventh-place effort in 3:33:23, surpassing Australia's Sara Carrigan by a scanty, two-second gap.

In 2009, Willock scored a career-high, seventh place as the top North American cyclist in the 124-km women's road race at the UCI World Championships in Mendrisio, Switzerland.

Following the end of 2010 season, Willock announced that she would leave Webcor Builders for the TIBCO-To-The-Top pro cycling team under a bi-annual contract. On January 10, 2012, Willock also decided to put her Olympic bid on hold, as she and her husband Tony Zarsadias, a professional road cyclist, were expecting to have their first newborn child shortly before the Olympic Games in London.

Career highlights

2002 – where she won her very very first race ever anywhere – Hartford, CT criterium riding for then top ranked (and steroid free) USA cycling team – Verizon Wireless presented by Cervelo
https://www.bikereg.com/Results/s/15543/hartford-downtown-criterium
Pro/1/2/3 Women
1  Erinne Willock        Verizon Wireless-Cervelo                        49:56

after having come in second only two weeks prior to the multi time (and future Verizon Wireless rider) Laura Van Gilder at the iconic Bear Mountain race just outside NYC
https://www.bikereg.com/Results/s/15540/bear-mountain-spring-classic
Women 1/2/3                         32 Starters                                    56 Miles
1  Laura        Van Gilder          Trek Plus
2  Erinne       Willock             Verizon Wireless

and the day before...  second again
https://www.bikereg.com/Results/s/15539/sterling-classic

Women 1/2/3   40m   winning time = 1:42:16  42 racers competed

1. Yvonne Ilton        Verizon Wireless – Cervelo
2. Erinne Willock      Verizon Wireless – Cervelo

2003
 2nd Stage 5, Tour de Toona, United States
2004
 3rd Canadian Championships (Road), Kamloops, British Columbia (CAN)
 3rd Overall, Tour de Toona, United States
 3rd Stage 1
 3rd Stage 6
2005
 1st Overall, San Dimas Stage Race, United States
 1st Stage 2
 2nd Canadian Championships (Road), Kamloops, British Columbia (CAN)
2006
 1st Overall, Joe Martin Stage Race, United States
 1st Stage 3
 2nd Pan American Road and Track Championships (ITT), Valencia (VEN)
 3rd Overall, Tour of the Gila, United States
 2nd Stage 2, Mogollon, New Mexico
 3rd Stage 1, Tyrone, New Mexico 
2007
 3rd Stage 5, Tour de l'Ardeche, France
 17th UCI World Championships (Road), Stuttgart (GER)
2008
 3rd Overall, Tour of New Zealand, New Zealand
 37th Olympic Games (Road), Beijing (CHN)
2009
 3rd Stage 1, Nature Valley Grand Prix, St. Paul, Minnesota
 3rd Stage 1, Joe Martin Stage Race, United States
 7th UCI World Championships (Road), Mendrisio (SUI)
2010
 3rd Overall, Cascade Cycling Classic, United States
 1st Stage 2
 3rd Stage 3
 8th Overall, GP Ouest-France, France
 9th Stage 5, Holland Ladies Tour, Rijssen (NED)
2011
 3rd Canadian Championships (Road), Toronto (CAN)
 5th Overall, GP Ouest-France, France

Personal life
Willock is the daughter of Martin Willock, who competed at the 1984 Summer Olympics. Her uncle Bernie Willock was scheduled to compete at the 1980 Summer Olympics, until Canada joined the boycott of that event.

References

External links
 
 
 
 Canadian Cycling Team Profile
 

1981 births
Living people
Canadian female cyclists
Cyclists at the 2008 Summer Olympics
Olympic cyclists of Canada
People from the Capital Regional District
Sportspeople from British Columbia